Lajos Kósa (born 14 March 1964) is a Hungarian politician, who served as Mayor of Debrecen between 1998 and 2014. He has been a Member of Parliament since 1990.

Kósa was appointed one of the four Vice Presidents of the Fidesz party in 2007, alongside Ildikó Pelczné Gáll, Zoltán Pokorni and Mihály Varga. He also secured an individual mandate during the parliamentary election in 2010. He retained his membership of the Local Government and Urban Development Committee. He was nominated First or Managing Vice President of Fidesz, after Party President Viktor Orbán was appointed Prime Minister of Hungary on 14 May 2010.

He was appointed leader of the Fidesz parliamentary group on 1 October 2015. He became minister without portfolio responsible for the Modern Cities Program on 2 October 2017, holding the position until 18 May 2018.

A huge scandal broke out in March 2018 involving Lajos Kósa and 4,3 billion euros.

In November 2021 Mr. Kósa was the first Hungarian senior official who acknowledged that the country's Interior Ministry purchased and used military-grade spyware Pegasus. Government of Viktor Orbán is accused of using it to spy on members of media as well as Hungarian opposition.

Personal life
He is married. His wife is Gyöngyi Porkoláb. They have four children - three daughters, Anna, Eszter and Lilla and a son, Levente.

See also
 , known as the "slave law"

References

External links
Kósa Lajos életrajza a Fidesz honlapján
Kósa Lajos országgyűlési adatlapja
Kósa Lajos Debrecen hivatalos honlapján
 Kósa Lajos: Nem a piszoárt kéne méricskélni! - Interview in the Index.hu website (March 30, 2010)

1964 births
Living people
Hungarian economists
Fidesz politicians
Members of the National Assembly of Hungary (1990–1994)
Members of the National Assembly of Hungary (1994–1998)
Members of the National Assembly of Hungary (1998–2002)
Members of the National Assembly of Hungary (2002–2006)
Members of the National Assembly of Hungary (2006–2010)
Members of the National Assembly of Hungary (2010–2014)
Members of the National Assembly of Hungary (2014–2018)
Members of the National Assembly of Hungary (2018–2022)
Members of the National Assembly of Hungary (2022–2026)
Mayors of places in Hungary
People from Debrecen
Corvinus University of Budapest alumni
Government ministers of Hungary
Mayors of Debrecen